Phoebe Belle Cates Kline (born July 16, 1963) is an American former actress, known primarily for her roles in films such as Fast Times at Ridgemont High (1982), Gremlins (1984) and Drop Dead Fred (1991).

Early life 
Cates was born on July 16, 1963, in New York City, to a family of television and Broadway production insiders. She is the daughter of Lily and Joseph Cates (originally Joseph Katz), who was a major Broadway producer and a pioneering figure in television, and who helped create The $64,000 Question. Her uncle, Gilbert Cates, produced numerous television specials, often in partnership with Cates's father, as well as several annual Academy Awards shows. Cates is Eurasian; both her father and maternal grandmother were of Russian Jewish descent, whereas her maternal grandfather was Chinese-Filipino. Cates's mother was born in Shanghai, China.

Cates attended the Professional Children's School, and the Juilliard School. At the age of ten, Cates started modeling, appearing in Seventeen and other teen-oriented magazines. A few years later, she wanted to become a dancer. Eventually, she received a scholarship to the School of American Ballet, but quit after a knee injury at age 14. Next, she began a short, successful career as a model. Cates said that she disliked the industry: "It was just the same thing, over and over. After a while, I did it solely for the money."

Career 
As a teen model, Cates appeared on the cover of Seventeen magazine four times. The first was the April 1979 issue. She subsequently appeared on the cover of Seventeen three more times, and appeared often inside the magazine on the editorial pages in 1979 and 1980.

Dissatisfied with modeling, Cates decided to pursue acting. She was offered her first part, in the movie Paradise (1982), after a screen test in New York. She was uncertain about doing the nudity the role required but her father encouraged her to take the job.

Paradise became Cates's film debut. The movie was filmed in Israel from March to May 1981. In the film, she performed several full-frontal nude scenes and several rear scenes while still a minor (age 17). The movie had a plot similar to The Blue Lagoon (1980). She also sang the film's main theme song and recorded an album of the same name. In a 1982 interview, she recalled having trouble with the change of career, because as a model, she had to be conscious of the camera, whereas in front of the movie camera, she could not. Cates later regretted being in the film: "What I learned was never to do a movie like that again." Cates claimed that the film's producers used a body double to film nude close-ups of her character without telling her. According to her co-star Willie Aames: "She will have nothing to do with the film. She's really upset about it. She won't do any promotion with me."

Later that year, Cates starred in Fast Times at Ridgemont High (1982), which featured what Rolling Stone has described as "the most memorable bikini-drop in cinema history." She was quoted as saying that she had the most fun in filming that movie.

The following year, Cates was in the comedy Private School (1983), which co-starred Matthew Modine and Betsy Russell, and for which she sang on two songs of the film's soundtrack, "Just One Touch" and "How Do I Let You Know."

In 1984, Cates starred in the TV mini-series Lace, based on a novel which Shirley Conran had written. She played the role of Lili "to get away from a sameness in her movie portrayals." During her audition, she so impressed the writer that he wanted to hire her there and then. Cates struggled with the portrayal of a bitter movie star because, despite her character's vicious persona, she intended for the audience to sympathize with her. She did not read Conran's novel, on which the movie was based, because she did not want to have a "fixed image." Her best-known line in the film, "Which one of you bitches is my mother?", was named the greatest line in television history by TV Guide in 1993. She also starred in the sequel mini-series Lace II.

In summer 1984, Cates co-starred in the box office hit Gremlins (1984) for executive producer Steven Spielberg, the highest-grossing film of her career. Six years later, she would reprise her character Kate Beringer in the sequel Gremlins 2: The New Batch (1990).

In June 1984, Cates made her stage debut in the Off-Broadway play The Nest of the Wood Grouse, a comedy by Soviet writer Viktor Rozov, at the Joseph Papp Public Theater. Cates said that while doing the play she "felt a certain freedom and a certain connection with acting that I had never really felt before." Cates appeared Off-Broadway again two years later in Rich Relations, written by David Henry Hwang, at the Second Stage Theatre. In December 1989, Cates made her Broadway debut in a revival of Paddy Chayefsky's The Tenth Man at the Vivian Beaumont Theater.

In 1988, Cates told an interviewer, "there are simply not that many good parts in film" but theater has "tons of good women's roles....I think of theater as what I like to do most....I've only felt happy as an actress for about two years. I rarely watch my film work."

Cates continued to appear steadily in films through the early 1990s, usually in supporting roles or as part of ensemble casts. These include Date with an Angel (1987), Bright Lights, Big City (1988), Heart of Dixie (1989), Shag (1989), Drop Dead Fred (1991) and Bodies, Rest & Motion (1993) (the latter three also featuring Bridget Fonda). These films suffered from mixed to poor reviews and failed to make an impact at the box office.

Cates had been set to play Steve Martin's daughter in the successful comedy Father of the Bride (1991), but her pregnancy with her first child forced her to drop out.

In 1994, Cates starred in the fact-based comedy-drama Princess Caraboo (1994), which also featured her husband Kevin Kline. This was the last film Cates appeared in before seemingly shifting her focus away from acting to raising her children, Owen and Greta.

In 2001, Cates briefly returned to acting for one film, The Anniversary Party (2001), as a favor to her best friend and former Fast Times at Ridgemont High castmate Jennifer Jason Leigh, who directed the film.

In 2015, Cates provided the voice of her Gremlins character Kate Beringer for the video game Lego Dimensions.

Personal life 
In the early 1980s, Cates shared an apartment in Greenwich Village with her then boyfriend Stavros Merjos. She met him in 1979 after she went to her first night at Studio 54 with family friend Andy Warhol.

In 1983, during her audition for a role (awarded to Meg Tilly) in The Big Chill, Cates met actor Kevin Kline. They were both dating other people at the time, but became romantically involved two years later. In 1989, they married, and she changed her name to Phoebe Cates Kline. The Klines moved to the Upper East Side of Manhattan in New York across Fifth Avenue from Central Park where they raised their two children, son Owen Joseph Kline (born 1991) and daughter Greta Kline (born 1994). Owen and Greta appeared, with their parents, in the 2001 movie The Anniversary Party. Owen also appeared in the 2005 film The Squid and the Whale and made his directorial debut with the coming-of-age black comedy Funny Pages, and Greta fronts the band Frankie Cosmos.

In 2005, Cates opened a boutique, Blue Tree, on Madison Avenue in New York.

Filmography

Film and television

Video games

References

External links 

 
 Blue Tree Cates's New York boutique's website
 
 

1963 births
20th-century American actresses
21st-century American actresses
Actresses from New York City
American actresses of Filipino descent
American people of Filipino descent
American women singers
American film actresses
American models of Filipino descent
American people of Chinese descent
American people of Russian-Jewish descent
American women in business
Businesspeople from New York City
Female models from New York (state)
Hewitt School alumni
Juilliard School alumni
Jewish American actresses
Living people
People from the Upper East Side
People from Greenwich Village
Singers from New York City
21st-century American Jews